Journals of Rudolph Friederich Kurz are the recorded recollections of the Swiss painter and adventurer Rudolf Friedrich Kurz from his journey along the Mississippi and Missouri between 1846 and 1852. "My chief task in this work was to give from my observations a fair portrayal of the American Indian in his romantic mode of life, a true representation of the larger fur-bearing animals and of the native prairies and forests", he wrote. While working as a clerk at forts Berthold and Union he came to know both Indians, fur-trappers, officers and the condition in the harsh frontier. His journals are also an account of historically important facts- the Mormon migration, the '49 Gold Rush. The journals are an interesting analysis of the 1840s in the mid-west.

References
Journals on GoogleBooks

American frontier
History of Missouri
History of Mississippi